Şevki or Sevki is a given name. Notable people with the name include:

 Şevki Balmumcu (1905–1982), Turkish architect
 Şevki Koru (1913–2003), Turkish long-distance runner
 Sevki Sha’ban (born 1984), Singapore footballer

See also
Shawki

Turkish masculine given names